"Theme of Exodus" is a song composed and performed by Ernest Gold. It serves as the main theme song to Otto Preminger's epic film Exodus, based on the 1958 novel of the same name by Leon Uris, which tells the story of founding of the modern State of Israel. The song was released on the soundtrack album for the picture. All music was written by Gold, who won both Best Soundtrack Album and Song of the Year at the 1961 Grammy Awards for the soundtrack and theme to Exodus respectively. It is the only instrumental song to ever receive that award.

Following its initial film appearance, the theme has been recorded by many artists in both instrumental and vocal versions, and has also appeared in a number of subsequent films and television programs. The best-known cover version of the theme is an instrumental version. This version was accompanied by The London Symphony Orchestra.
Bob Marley incorporated portions of the theme into his song "Exodus".

An instrumental version of the song by Ferrante & Teicher made Number 1 on the US Cashbox Top 100 and  Number 2 on the Billboard Hot 100 in January 1961, Number 6 in the UK in April 1961 and Number 2 on the Australian Kent Music Report charts also in April 1961. It reached Number 1 in New Zealand.

In 2012, American animator Nina Paley released a satirical animated music video set to the song (as performed by Andy Williams).

References

Film theme songs
1960 songs
1960 singles
1960s instrumentals
Songs written for films
Cashbox number-one singles
Grammy Award for Song of the Year
Number-one singles in New Zealand
RCA Victor singles